Milko Bjelica (born June 4, 1984) is a Serbian-born Montenegrin professional basketball player for Al-Ittihad Jeddah of the Saudi Premier League.

Professional career
He began his professional career with Crvena zvezda, where he spent five seasons. He then played in Germany with Phantoms Braunschweig and Köln 99ers. In 2008 he signed with Lietuvos rytas, and made his EuroLeague debut during the 2009–10 season.

In July 2011 he signed a two-year deal with Saski Baskonia. On October 28, 2013, he re-signed with Saski Baskonia on a short-term deal. On December 30, 2013, he signed with the Turkish Euroleague team Anadolu Efes for the remainder of the season. On July 9, 2014, he extended his contract with Efes for two more years. On June 22, 2015, he left Efes and signed with Darüşşafaka for the 2015–16 season.

On September 8, 2016, Bjelica returned to Crvena zvezda, signing a two-year contract. On April 17, 2018, after parting ways with Crvena zvezda, Bjelica returned to Spain, signing with Basket Zaragoza for the remainder of the season.

Career statistics

Euroleague

|-
| style="text-align:left;"| 2009–10
| style="text-align:left;" rowspan=2| Lietuvos Rytas
| 10 || 2 || 21.5 || .462 || .154 || .667 || 4.3 || 1.1 || .4 || .2 || 11.8 || 9.0
|-
| style="text-align:left;"| 2010–11
| 16 || 10 || 26.1 || .533 || .279 || .727 || 4.7 || 1.4 || .7 || .4 || 12.3 || 12.1
|-
| style="text-align:left;"| 2011–12
| style="text-align:left;" rowspan=3| Baskonia
| 8 || 2 || 23.7 || .492 || .294 || .842 || 3.9 || .8 || .8 || .1 || 10.6 || 9.5
|-
| style="text-align:left;"| 2012–13
| 27 || 19 || 17.3 || .406 || .378 || .750 || 2.7 || 1.2 || .5 || .2 || 5.4 || 5.7
|-
| style="text-align:left;"| 2013–14
| 8 || 3 || 21.3 || .594 || .353 || style="background:#CFECEC;"|.952 || 4.4 || 1.3 || .3 || .4 || 12.8 || 13.8
|-
| style="text-align:left;"| 2013–14
| style="text-align:left;" rowspan=2| Anadolu Efes
| 14 || 3 || 22.8 || .459 || .270 || style="background:#CFECEC;"|.913 || 2.5 || 1.2 || .6 || .1 || 9.4 || 7.5
|-
| style="text-align:left;"| 2014–15
| 28 || 7 || 16.2 || .462 || .415 || .736 || 2.5 || .8 || .2 || .3 || 7.8 || 6.8
|-
| style="text-align:left;"| 2015–16
| style="text-align:left;"| Darüşşafaka
| 24 || 6 || 19.1 || .434 || .354 || .679 || 3.4 || .8 || .4 || .1 || 7.5 || 7.5
|-
| style="text-align:left;"| 2016–17
| style="text-align:left;"| Crvena zvezda
| 30 || 1 || 15.6 || .385 || .193 || .795 || 3.0 || 1.1 || .5 || .3 || 7.4 || 7.5
|-
| style="text-align:left;"| 2017–18
| style="text-align:left;"| Crvena zvezda
| 29 || 29 || 26.0 || .397 || .297 || .703 || 3.7 || 1.3 || .4 || .2 || 9.2 || 8.8
|- class="sortbottom"
| style="text-align:center;" colspan=2| Career
| 194 || 82 || 20.2 || .446 || .305 || .750 || 3.3 || 1.1 || .4 || .2 || 8.6 || 8.1

Personal life
Born and raised in Belgrade, Serbia, he internationally represents Montenegro, where his grandfather is from.  One of his sisters, Milka, is also a basketball player, while another, Ana is a Serbian volleyball player.

See also 
 List of KK Crvena zvezda players with 100 games played

References

External links

 Milko Bjelica at aba-liga.com
 Milko Bjelica at euroleague.net
 Milko Bjelica at fiba.com
 Milko Bjelica at tblstat.net

1984 births
Living people
ABA League players
Alvark Tokyo players
Anadolu Efes S.K. players
Basket Zaragoza players
Basketball players from Belgrade
Basketball League of Serbia players
Basketball Löwen Braunschweig players
BC Rytas players
Darüşşafaka Basketbol players
KK Crvena zvezda players
Köln 99ers players
Liga ACB players
Montenegrin men's basketball players
Montenegrin people of Serbian descent
Saski Baskonia players
Serbian expatriate basketball people in Germany
Serbian expatriate basketball people in Japan
Serbian expatriate basketball people in Lithuania
Serbian expatriate basketball people in Montenegro
Serbian expatriate basketball people in Saudi Arabia
Serbian expatriate basketball people in Spain
Serbian expatriate basketball people in Turkey
Serbian expatriate basketball people in Qatar
Serbian men's basketball players
2019 FIBA Basketball World Cup players
Centers (basketball)
Power forwards (basketball)